The Thomas Downs House is a historic home located just east of Charlestown, Indiana's town square.  It was built about 1809. and is a two-story, four bay, Federal style brick dwelling. It has a gable roof, sits on a stone foundation, and has a one-story rear ell.  Thomas Downs was a politician from Charlestown that was Clark County's first county treasurer.  He would later serve as an Indiana Territory legislator. It is owned by the Clark's Grant Historical Society, who has a museum there but offers tours by reservation only.

It was listed on the National Register of Historic Places in 1984.

References

External links

Charlestown, Indiana
Houses on the National Register of Historic Places in Indiana
Federal architecture in Indiana
Houses completed in 1809
Houses in Clark County, Indiana
National Register of Historic Places in Clark County, Indiana